Bunker Hill is an unincorporated community in Connersville Township, Fayette County, Indiana.

Geography

References

Unincorporated communities in Fayette County, Indiana
Unincorporated communities in Indiana